Ceranów  is a village in Sokołów County, Masovian Voivodeship, in east-central Poland. It is the seat of the gmina (administrative district) called Gmina Ceranów.

The village has a population of 810.

References

Villages in Sokołów County